Prince station is an Amtrak station in  Prince, West Virginia, served by the Cardinal.  It serves as the main depot for the Beckley area because it is on the CSX (originally Chesapeake & Ohio Railway) mainline while Beckley itself is not.

History
The Chesapeake and Ohio Railway built the first facility in 1880 that was enlarged in 1891 to serve both freight and passengers. In 1942, the C&O president, Robert R. Young, saw a need for "a stylish, streamlined, and efficient passenger rail system" that led to the development of the current station.

Design
The design of the Prince train station is Art Moderne, similar to  Art Deco, with a horizontal design, emphasizing movement and sleekness. Built in 1946, the architectural firm was Garfield, Harris, Robinson, & Schafer that was headquartered in Cleveland, Ohio. The terrazzo floor has embedded in it the original C&O “Chessie” kitten logo.

The depot has a minimum of ornamentation. Each end of the  canopy is rounded and topped with Streamline Moderne stainless steel lettering spelling out "Prince". The canopy is oriented so that the sun would warm waiting passengers in the winter time, while shading them in the summer.

Future

References

External links

Prince Amtrak Station – USA Rail Guide (TrainWeb)

Amtrak stations in West Virginia
Buildings and structures in Fayette County, West Virginia
Railway stations in West Virginia
Stations along Chesapeake and Ohio Railway lines
Transportation in Fayette County, West Virginia
Art Deco architecture in West Virginia